3230 or variant, may refer to:

In general
 A.D. 3230, a year in the 4th millennium CE
 3230 BC, a year in the 4th millennium BCE
 3230, a number in the 3000 (number) range

Other uses
 3230 Vampilov, an asteroid in the Asteroid Belt, the 3230th asteroid registered
 Nokia 3230, a cellphone
 ALFA-PROJ Model 3230, a handgun
 Kentucky Route 3230, a state highway
 Texas Farm to Market Road 3230, a state highway

See also

 , a WWI U.S. Navy freighter